Urbank is a city in Otter Tail County, Minnesota, United States. The population was 52 at the 2020 census.

Geography

Otter Tail County Roads 38 and 59 are the main routes in the community.

Demographics

2010 census
As of the census of 2010, there were 54 people, 27 households, and 13 families living in the city. The racial makeup of the city was 100.0% White.

There were 27 households, of which 18.5% had children under the age of 18 living with them, 37.0% were married couples living together, 3.7% had a female householder with no husband present, 7.4% had a male householder with no wife present, and 51.9% were non-families. 51.9% of all households were made up of individuals, and 25.9% had someone living alone who was 65 years of age or older. The average household size was 2.00 and the average family size was 3.00.

The median age in the city was 40.5 years. 20.4% of residents were under the age of 18; 9.3% were between the ages of 18 and 24; 20.5% were from 25 to 44; 26% were from 45 to 64; and 24.1% were 65 years of age or older. The gender makeup of the city was 55.6% male and 44.4% female.

2000 census
As of the census of 2000, there were 59 people, 32 households, and 16 families living in the city. The racial makeup of the city was 100.00% White.

There were 32 households, out of which 21.9% had children under the age of 18 living with them, 43.8% were married couples living together, 3.1% had a female householder with no husband present, and 46.9% were non-families. 46.9% of all households were made up of individuals, and 25.0% had someone living alone who was 65 years of age or older. The average household size was 1.84 and the average family size was 2.59.

In the city, the population was spread out, with 15.3% under the age of 18, 10.2% from 18 to 24, 22.0% from 25 to 44, 28.8% from 45 to 64, and 23.7% who were 65 years of age or older. The median age was 48 years. For every 100 females, there were 103.4 males. For every 100 females age 18 and over, there were 108.3 males.

The median income for a household in the city was $40,625, and the median income for a family was $46,458. Males had a median income of $31,250 versus $12,083 for females. The per capita income for the city was $15,105. There were no families and 7.3% of the population living below the poverty line, including no under eighteens and 20.0% of those over 64.

Baseball history

Urbank Goldtimers
Established in 1903, the Urbank Goldtimers have competed at the Senior Men's Baseball level for almost 120 years.  The first known team was formed after neighboring Millerville's team experienced irreconcilable team division (history is unclear, but insider trading on goat deals is the most likely cause) and several players hitched up their oxen and carved a new field of play out of the corn in Urbank.  Jebediah Urbank, founder of the city, managed for the first 20 years, and holds the managerial record for winning percentage (.882%) despite the Second Industrial Revolution's impact on other local teams' equipment development and losing many Urbank men to the Great Verndale Migration of 1907–1909.

The Goldtimers are known for their utter dedication to playing baseball the right way, and an intense focus on post-game refueling strategies, sponsored by Mickey's widemouth bottles.  Urban teams visiting the Urbank field are often so intimidated by the close proximity of cows to the batting cages that they skip pre-game routines altogether, only to find themselves at the mercy of the Goldtimers' offense. Urbank fans are trained in advanced cowbell tactics and act in concert to disrupt visiting teams with precision in volume and scale of cowbell usage.

Urbank Silverminers
A brief, but fierce, local baseball rivalry within the Urbank city limits flared between 1946 and 1950.  As World War II called American soldiers to war, the Goldtimers took a leave from baseball to attend to matters overseas.  With every Goldtimer volunteering for duty by 1942, and almost entirely responsible for Desert Campaign victories over Rommel in Africa, the baseball town was starved of baseball. A contingent of ballplayers sojourning west from Motley, MN arrived and established a new 35+ team - the Silverminers - in the Goldtimers' stead.  

Returning victorious in WWII, the Goldtimers sought to reestablish Urbank baseball dominance and challenged the Silverminers to a best of 7 series, with the field's ownership hanging in the balance. Jebediah Dorn threw four straight no-hitters to clear the Silverminers from the city limits and erased the Silverminers from the local baseball scene forever.

References

Cities in Otter Tail County, Minnesota
Cities in Minnesota